The Duchy of Cornwall Act 1844 (7 & 8 Vict c 65) is an Act of the Parliament of the United Kingdom.

Nothing in the Duchy of Cornwall Management Act 1863 contained takes away, alters or prejudices, further or otherwise than as the same are thereby expressly rescinded or altered, any powers or provisions contained in the Duchy of Cornwall Act 1844.

See also sections 6 and 14 of the Assessionable Manors Award Act 1848.

References

External links

The Duchy of Cornwall Act 1844, as amended, from Legislation.gov.uk.
The Duchy of Cornwall Act 1844, as originally enacted, from Legislation.gov.uk.

United Kingdom Acts of Parliament 1844
Duchy of Cornwall
19th century in Cornwall